is a Japanese manga series written and illustrated by Mitsuteru Yokoyama. It was serialized in Shogakukan's Weekly Shōnen Sunday from 1961 to 1966. The series was collected into fifteen tankōbon volumes released between 1969 and 1976. The manga was adapted into a live-action film by the Toei Company in 1963.

Cast 

 Kagemaru of the Iga: Hiroki Matsukata
 Ieyasu Tokugawa: Ryuji Kita
 Ukyo: Kyoko Mikage
 Sandayu Hyakuchi: Kinnosuke Takamatsu
 Daihachi: Nobuo Saito
 Sayamaru: Etsuko Kotani
 Evil Demon Amano: Shingo Yamashiro
 Hansuke: Yoshio Yoshida
 Kumomaru: Dan Tokumaro
 Gorobei: Kenji Kusumoto
 Hantayu: Hiroshi Hatano
 Jubei: Daisuke Awaji
 Inumaru: Mitsuo Asano

References

External links 

 

Shogakukan manga
Toei Company films
Japanese action films